Touch Pancharong (born 5 March 1990, in Koh Kong, Cambodia) is a former Cambodian footballer who used to play for home town club Koh Kong in Cambodian Second League.

He has represented Cambodia at senior international level.

Honours

Club
Phnom Penh Crown
 Cambodian League: 2010
Boeung Ket Angkor
 Cambodian League: 2012.2016.2017
 2015 Mekong Club Championship: Runner up

References

External links
 

1990 births
Living people
Cambodian footballers
Cambodia international footballers
Phnom Penh Crown FC players
Boeung Ket Rubber Field players
People from Koh Kong province
Association football defenders